St. John's School Ghazipur, India, is a branch of St John's School India, administered by the Roman Catholic Diocese of Varanasi, which is a registered charitable society. The religious congregation of the Congregation of Jesus (CJ) is involved in its administration. The school is under the religious jurisdiction of the Catholic Bishop of Varanasi.

St. John's School has one branch:
 St. John's School, Tulsipur
Principal:- Fr.Gurusanthraj Sir

St. John's School 
The school aims at the education of the Catholic community around and extends its services to the members of other communities to the extent possible. The school was started at a time when there was a need for more higher secondary education in the city. It began under the guidance of its first principal Father Euigene. Present principal of the institution is Father Raj guru who is fourth principal. Father David who is the third principal. Second Principal was Father Susai Raj.

English is the medium of instruction, communication and examination in this institution. The school is affiliated to the Council for the Indian School Certificate Examination, New Delhi, with 'No Objection' certificate from the U.P. Government. It prepares students for the ICSE (10 year course) and ISC (12 year course). The Council's examination curriculum includes: English (Language and Literature), Hindi, Sanskrit, History & Civics, Geography, Mathematics, Physics, Chemistry, Biology, Economics, Commerce, Accountancy and Computer Studies.

The foundation was laid in the year 1997 with holy baptism by the most. rev. bishop Patrick D'Souza.

House System
There are four houses in school - Red, Blue, Green and Yellow. Each Student, on admission, is placed in one of these houses. Each house is headed by one boy and one girl known as House Captain, supported by vice-captains. A member of the staff assisted by several other teachers help the House Captains in fulfilling their duties pro-actively. Points are awarded to students throughout the year for co-curricular activities, games and sports. At the end of the year, the House gaining the highest number of points is awarded the best House trophy. Every outstanding student is given a certificate.

Facilities
St. John's School has hi-tech modern facilities for an interactive way of learning. The school has collaborated with TeachNext solutions for an interactive next generation learning experience. School premises are also under CCTV surveillance to make sure the students are given proper attention. With TeachNext, every class is equipped with latest smart board facilities. Using state of the art projectors and stereo speakers, the classes can easily be turned into next generation learning environments supporting the latest paradigms in quick, efficient and all round learning.

Sports
The school conducts various athletic tournaments, where the winners are awarded with medals. There are also tournaments for cricket and football in which all the four houses compete for a podium finish. There are also sports like discus throw, javelin throw and shot put. At the end, all the houses are given points based on their performance in these tournaments. The house with the highest number of points gets to be the champion.

References

External links
St. John's School, Ghazipur Website

Catholic schools in India
High schools and secondary schools in Uttar Pradesh
Christian schools in Uttar Pradesh
Education in Ghazipur district
Ghazipur
1997 establishments in Uttar Pradesh
Educational institutions established in 1997